In the mathematical field of order theory, an element a of a partially ordered set with least element 0 is an atom if 0 < a and there is no x such that 0 < x < a. 

Equivalently, one may define an atom to be an element that is minimal among the non-zero elements, or alternatively an element that covers the least element 0.

Atomic orderings

Let <: denote the covering relation in a partially ordered set.

A partially ordered set with a least element 0 is atomic if every element b > 0 has an atom a below it, that is, there is some a such that b ≥ a :> 0.  Every finite partially ordered set with 0 is atomic, but the set of nonnegative real numbers (ordered in the usual way) is not atomic (and in fact has no atoms).

A partially ordered set is relatively atomic (or strongly atomic) if for all a < b there is an element c such that a <: c ≤ b or, equivalently, if every interval [a, b] is atomic. Every relatively atomic partially ordered set with a least element is atomic. Every finite poset is relatively atomic.

A partially ordered set with least element 0 is called atomistic (not to be confused with atomic) if every element is the least upper bound of a set of atoms. The linear order with three elements is not atomistic (see Fig. 2).

Atoms in partially ordered sets are abstract generalizations of singletons in set theory (see Fig. 1). Atomicity (the property of being atomic) provides an abstract generalization in the context of order theory of the ability to select an element from a non-empty set.

Coatoms
The terms coatom, coatomic, and coatomistic are defined dually.  Thus, in a partially ordered set with greatest element 1, one says that
 a coatom is an element covered by 1,
 the set is coatomic if every b < 1 has a coatom c above it, and
 the set is coatomistic if every element is the greatest lower bound of a set of coatoms.

References

External links
 
 

Order theory